Trubila is a Belarusian surname. Notable people with the surname include:

 Pavel Trubila (born 1991), Belarusian footballer
 Vitali Trubila (born 1985), Belarusian footballer

See also
 

Belarusian-language surnames